Henrik Tamraz  (May 28, 1935 – November 19, 1996) was an Iranian weightlifter of Assyrian descent. In 1958 he won bronze medals at the World Championships and at the Asian Games. He competed  at the 1956 and 1960 Summer Olympics and placed 5th and 14th, respectively. After retiring from competitions he first worked as a weightlifting coach and sports commentator. His trainees included Mohammad Nassiri and Parviz Jalayer.

References

Iranian male weightlifters
Iranian strength athletes
People from Urmia
Iranian Assyrian people
Iranian people of Armenian descent
World Weightlifting Championships medalists
1935 births
1996 deaths
Weightlifters at the 1956 Summer Olympics
Weightlifters at the 1960 Summer Olympics
Olympic weightlifters of Iran
Asian Games bronze medalists for Iran
Asian Games medalists in weightlifting
Weightlifters at the 1958 Asian Games
Medalists at the 1958 Asian Games
20th-century Iranian people